Émile Walhem (born 1896, date of death unknown) was a Belgian wrestler. He competed at the 1920 and the 1924 Summer Olympics.

References

External links
 

1896 births
Year of death missing
Olympic wrestlers of Belgium
Wrestlers at the 1920 Summer Olympics
Wrestlers at the 1924 Summer Olympics
Belgian male sport wrestlers
Place of birth missing